Daniel Patrick Trebil (born April 10, 1974) is an American former professional ice hockey player who played in the NHL with the Mighty Ducks of Anaheim, Pittsburgh Penguins, and St. Louis Blues between 1996 and 2001. He played defense and shot right-handed.

Trebil was drafted out of high school by the New Jersey Devils in the 6th round, 138th overall in the 1992 NHL Entry Draft. After being drafted Trebil decided to go to college and played with the University of Minnesota for 4 years. He increased his point total each year while in college, scoring 46 points in 42 games his senior season (1995–1996) and being named to the WCHA second All-Star team and NCAA West second All-Star team.

After college Trebil signed with the Mighty Ducks of Anaheim. He played the majority of the 1996–1997 season with the Baltimore Bandits of the AHL while also making his NHL debut with the Mighty Ducks, appearing in 29 games and scoring 6 points. The next 2 seasons were much the same for Trebil. He played sparingly with the Mighty Ducks, spending most of the time with the Cincinnati Mighty Ducks.

For the 1999–2000 season Trebil played 52 games with the Cincinnati Mighty Ducks, scoring 28 points. Towards the end of the year he was traded to the Pittsburgh Penguins and appeared in 3 games with the Penguins. After signing with the New York Islanders for the 2000–2001 season Trebil was quickly traded back to the Penguins. Trebil played 16 games with the Penguins before being traded to the St. Louis Blues. Trebil split the remainder of the season with the Blues and the Worcester IceCats.

Trebil signed with Stockholm-based Hammarby IF in Allsvenskan, Sweden's second-tier hockey league, in 2001. He played briefly with the team, appearing in 18 games, before retiring from hockey.

Career statistics

Regular season and playoffs

International

Awards and honors

External links
 

1974 births
Living people
American men's ice hockey defensemen
Baltimore Bandits players
Chicago Wolves (IHL) players
Cincinnati Mighty Ducks players
Hammarby Hockey (1921–2008) players
Ice hockey players from Minnesota
Mighty Ducks of Anaheim players
Minnesota Golden Gophers men's ice hockey players
New Jersey Devils draft picks
Pittsburgh Penguins players
St. Louis Blues players
Sportspeople from Bloomington, Minnesota
Worcester IceCats players
AHCA Division I men's ice hockey All-Americans